Ora Adams House is a historic home located at Danville, Hendricks County, Indiana.  It was built in 1883, and is a one-story, Queen Anne style frame cottage.  It has a cross-gable roof and sits on a brick foundation.  It is the only extant building associated with first campus buildings of the Central Normal School.

It was added to the National Register of Historic Places in 2009.

References

Houses on the National Register of Historic Places in Indiana
Queen Anne architecture in Indiana
Houses completed in 1883
National Register of Historic Places in Hendricks County, Indiana
Buildings and structures in Hendricks County, Indiana